Lophoscutus prehensilis is a species of ambush bug in the family Reduviidae. It is found in Central America and North America.

Subspecies
These two subspecies belong to the species Lophoscutus prehensilis:
 Lophoscutus prehensilis minor (Kormilev, 1954)
 Lophoscutus prehensilis prehensilis (Fabricius, 1803)

References

Further reading

 

Reduviidae
Articles created by Qbugbot
Insects described in 1803